Eupithecia julia is a moth in the family Geometridae. It is found in western China (Sichuan).

The wingspan is about 19–23 mm. The forewings are whitish grey and the hindwings are also whitish grey, but paler.

References

Moths described in 2004
julia
Moths of Asia